Edward Higginbottom, DPhil (Oxon), BMus (Cantab),  (born 16 November 1946, Kendal) is a music scholar, organist, choirmaster and conductor. Most of his career has been as organist at New College, Oxford, where he led their choir for more than 35 years and produced a large number of choral recordings.

Musical biography

Before moving on to St Mary’s Church in Warwick, Edward was a chorister at his local parish church where he started playing the organ.  Edward completed his undergraduate and graduate training as organ scholar of Corpus Christi College, Cambridge, where he developed a particular interest in French baroque music and became a Fellow of the Royal College of Organists. He toured regularly in France at that time as director of the Cambridge University Purcell Society. As a graduate student, he spent time in France (1970-1972),  studying the organ with Marie-Claire Alain while working on his doctoral thesis.

He was appointed as the Organist and Director of Music at New College, Oxford in 1976. While the main role of the choir is to provide liturgical music for worship, Edward went further, organizing economically viable choir tours and a broad set of musical recordings. By doing so, he "has helped the cause of such institutions through a period when financial constraints and changes in social attitudes have threatened choral foundations".

In 1990 he was made an officer, and subsequently a Commandeur of the Ordre des Arts et des Lettres by the French Ministry of Culture for "his role in the revival of choir schools in France and support of French cultural activities".

In 2010 he formed a new recording label for the Choir, novum, and the choir began experimenting with weekly webcasting of their Evensong services.

Retiring from New College in 2014, he continues his musical career as a freelancer. He is the principal conductor of an Oxford ensemble called Instruments of Time and Truth. In spite of his retirement, however, he was named in March 2019 as the Director of Chapel Music at St Peter's College, Oxford for the 2019/20 academic year, pending the appointment of a successor to Jeremy Summerly in 2020.

Personal life
Edward and his wife Caroline have 7 adult children, including his son (who was also a chorister) Orlando, better known professionally as Totally Enormous Extinct Dinosaurs, an animal chiropractor, a jeweller, a doctor, a teacher, a timpanist, and a writer.

An early episode of ITV’s Inspector Morse featured a character based on Edward Higginbottom (although the suspect, and his obsession with Spangles and Trebor Mints, bears no similarity to the real Edward Higginbottom).

Recordings

Recent recordings include:

Publications related to music
Edward Higginbottom has edited music by François Couperin and Michel Corrette, and written articles on French Baroque music.

 "Organ Music and the liturgy", Cambridge Companion to the Organ
 "The French classical organ school", Cambridge Companion to the Organ

References

External links
 Choir of New College, Oxford
 Novum
 Last FM, Choir of New College
 Instruments of Time and Truth
 
 

Cathedral organists
English classical composers
Commandeurs of the Ordre des Arts et des Lettres
Fellows of New College, Oxford
1946 births
Living people
20th-century English musicians
Fellows of the Royal College of Organists
Organists of New College, Oxford
21st-century organists